Cole East Hawkins (born October 4, 1991) is an American actor in both television and film.

Early and personal life
Cole was born in Manhattan.

He attended Northeastern University.

Career
Hawkins appeared in School of Rock as Leonard, the band security guard. His line in that film "You mean we're not in the band?" initially encourages Dewey, played by Jack Black to transform the non-musicians in the class into members of the crew. He has also made minor appearances in such films as Changing Lanes, Big Daddy, Meet the Parents, Music of the Heart, Kate & Leopold, and The Naked Brothers Band: The Movie. He has made television appearances in Law & Order, Third Watch and Little Bill.

Filmography

Film

Television

References

External links
 

1991 births
Male actors from New York City
American male film actors
American male television actors
Living people
African-American male actors
The Naked Brothers Band members
21st-century African-American people